Christian Keller (born August 3, 1972 in Essen, North Rhine-Westphalia). is a former medley and freestyle swimmer from Germany, who competed in four consecutive Summer Olympics for his native country, starting in 1992. Four years later the three-time European Junior Champion won the bronze medal with the men's 4×200 m freestyle relay. Keller was named German Swimmer of the Year for two consecutive years: 1994 and 1995.

References
 Personal website Christian Keller
 

1972 births
Living people
German male swimmers
Olympic swimmers of Germany
Male medley swimmers
Olympic bronze medalists for Germany
Swimmers at the 1992 Summer Olympics
Swimmers at the 1996 Summer Olympics
Swimmers at the 2000 Summer Olympics
Swimmers at the 2004 Summer Olympics
Sportspeople from Essen
Olympic bronze medalists in swimming
German male freestyle swimmers
World Aquatics Championships medalists in swimming
Medalists at the FINA World Swimming Championships (25 m)
European Aquatics Championships medalists in swimming
Medalists at the 1996 Summer Olympics